Liberty Historic District is a national historic district located at Liberty, Randolph County, North Carolina, United States.The district encompasses 48 contributing buildings and 2 contributing structures in the central business district and surrounding residential sections of Liberty.  It includes buildings built between about 1880 to about 1950 and notable examples of Queen Anne and Colonial Revival architecture. Notable buildings include the Liberty Depot (c. 1885), Reitzel Building (c. 1925), the Farmer's Union Mercantile Co. Building (c. 1905), the Curtis Theater (1949), Bob Patterson House, the A.J. Patterson House, the Bascom M. and Alpha L. Brower House (c. 1915), J.C. Luther House, the Clarence Kennedy House (1940), and Hardin's Florist (c. 1940).

It was added to the National Register of Historic Places in 2000.

References

Historic districts on the National Register of Historic Places in North Carolina
Queen Anne architecture in North Carolina
Colonial Revival architecture in North Carolina
Buildings and structures in Randolph County, North Carolina
National Register of Historic Places in Randolph County, North Carolina